In 2013, Kent County Cricket Club competed in Division Two of the County Championship, Group A of the 40-over Yorkshire Bank 40 and the South Group of the Friends Life t20. Kent also hosted a first-class match at the St Lawrence Ground against Cardiff MCCU at the start of the season and a T20 match against the touring New Zealanders in June. It was the second season in charge for head coach Jimmy Adams. The club captain was England spinner James Tredwell, taking over from Rob Key who had been club captain since 2006. Brendan Nash registered as a Kolpak player, ending his West Indies international career, which allowed Kent to sign another overseas player. South African fast bowler Vernon Philander filled this role, although he was only with the club for a short spell in July. Another new addition to the squad was 22-year-old Calum Haggett from Somerset. Shortly before the end of the season, Kent signed two young fast bowlers: Charlie Hartley and Matt Hunn (Matt Hunn made his debut in the final county championship match of 2013). In addition, Mitchell Claydon joined on loan from Durham on 11 June initially for one month, but this was extended for a second month (he later signed on a permanent basis for 2014).

Kent endured a difficult season, finishing seventh of nine in Division two of the County Championship (despite only losing twice; 11 of their 16 matches were drawn) and making little impact on the List A Yorkshire Bank 40 competition (won 6, lost 6) or the Friends Life t20 (won 3, lost 7).

23-year-old all-rounder Matt Coles joined Hampshire on loan in August before signing a three-year contract with them in September. Batsman Mike Powell announced his retirement in September after two years with Kent (and previously 15 years with Glamorgan). Despite being Kent's leading wicket taker in the County Championship in 2013, Charlie Shreck was not offered a new contract and he later signed for Leicestershire.

James Tredwell received further international recognition for England, playing in all five One Day Internationals of the January 2013 tour of India, and a further 10 ODIs during the English summer - including the final of the 2013 Champions Trophy. Tredwell took a total of 25 wickets in these matches, taking his tally to 36 wickets in 24 ODIs. He also took 2 wickets in 5 T20 Internationals (taking his total to 3 wickets in 7 T20Is), and was made captain for the second home T20I against New Zealand.

Squad
 No. denotes the player's squad number, as worn on the back of their shirt.
 Ages given as of the first day of the County Championship season, 10 April 2013.

County Championship

Division Two

Matches

Other First-Class Match

MCCU Matches

Yorkshire Bank 40

Group A

Matches

Friends Life t20

South Division

Matches

Other T20 Match

Tour Match
2013 New Zealand tour of England

Statistics

Batting

Bowling

References

External links
Kent home at ESPN cricinfo
Kent County Cricket Club official site

2013
2013 in English cricket